The Railway Children are a British new wave band, formed in Wigan in 1984, by Gary Newby (songwriter/vocals/guitar/keyboards), Brian Bateman (rhythm/guitar), Guy Keegan (drums), and Stephen Hull (bass).

Career
Factory Records recorded their debut single "A Gentle Sound" in 1986. This was followed by their first album, Reunion Wilderness in 1987, which topped the UK Indie Chart. They left Factory shortly afterwards and were signed to Virgin Records.

1988 saw the release of their second album, Recurrence, on Virgin Records, and support tours with R.E.M. in Europe (Work Tour) and The Sugarcubes in the US. A national chart hit eluded them with singles "In the Meantime", "Somewhere South" and "Over and Over". In 1990, they released Native Place, an album that saw the band take a more pop oriented direction, with keyboard textures coming more to the fore than previously. "Every Beat of the Heart" became a top 40 hit in the UK with a peak at No. 24, and the song became a No. 1 hit on the newly founded Modern Rock Tracks chart in the U.S.

The band parted with Virgin Records in 1992, and broke up soon after. Keegan later had a spell in the Wigan-based folk rock band The Tansads, The Crash Band, and The Ultras, while Hull and Bateman left music for good.

Newby continued solo, and has since released several albums as the Railway Children: Dream Arcade (1997, Ether Records), Gentle Sound (2002, Ether Records) and two collections of rare recordings: Rarities #1 in 2007 and Rarities #2 in 2010; the latter available only by download from his official site. Newby spent several years in Japan from 2002 onwards, writing/arranging music and lyrics for several major Japanese artists, including Anna Tsuchiya, Every Little Thing, V6, Detroit Metal City, Sailor Moon and Yoshikuni Douchin.

In 2016, the original line up of Newby, Keegan, Hull and Bateman began rehearsing together and went on to play several times, including the NYC Popfest, the Shiiine On Weekender and concerts in Manchester, Berlin and London as well as a hometown gig as the headline band at the Wigan Diggers Festival.

Discography

Studio albums

Compilation albums
Radio One Evening Sessions (Strange Fruit, 1993)
Listen On: The Best of the Railway Children (Virgin Records, 1995)
Gentle Sound (acoustic compilation album) (Ether Records, 2003)
Rarities 1# (2007) – download only
Rarities 2# (2010) – download only

Singles

References

External links

English new wave musical groups
Music in the Metropolitan Borough of Wigan
Factory Records artists
Musical groups established in 1984
Musical groups from Greater Manchester
Virgin Records artists